Churayevo (Suray; , Čoraj) is a rural locality (a selo) and the administrative centre of Churayevsky Selsoviet, Mishkinsky District, Bashkortostan, Russia. The population was 984 as of 2010. There are 9 streets.

Geography 
Churayevo is located 43 km northwest of Mishkino (the district's administrative centre) by road. Oktyabr is the nearest rural locality.

References 

Rural localities in Mishkinsky District